Mikhail Makarovich Sazhin, born in 1818 in Galich and deceased in 1885 in Omsk, was a Russian landscape painter.

Life 
Sazhin studied at the Imperial Academy of Arts in Saint Petersburg from 1834 until 1840, and became a member of the academy in 1855. In 1844, he moved to Ukraine, and in Kyiv in 1846 he began working with Taras Shevchenko, whom he probably knew from Saint Petersburg.

Others are held in the National Art Museum of Ukraine, in the Russian Museum in Saint Petersburg, and in the National Museum in Warsaw. A street in Kyiv was named in his honour in 1962.

Works 
His works are essentially landscapes mixing the urban and rural in a picturesque perspective. They offer interesting and unexpected views of the city of Kyiv and the neighbourhood of Podil from the surrounding hills before the widespread adoption of photography.

References 

Imperial Academy of Arts alumni
19th-century painters from the Russian Empire
Ukrainian painters
Russian landscape painters
1885 deaths
1818 births